The GM6C was a solitary testbed electric locomotive for freight duties built by General Motors' Electro-Motive Division of the United States in collaboration with ASEA of Sweden.  It was rolled out from EMD's La Grange, Illinois plant on May 1, 1975. Equipped with close to standard C-C HTC trucks and traction motors, it was designed for lower-speed drag freight service.

Motives 
At the time, high oil prices had a number of large US railroads contemplating electrification of their most heavily used lines, while the only major US railroad with freight-hauling electrification, the Penn Central, had a fleet of aging locomotives needing replacement.

Circumstances changed after the GM6C and GM10B locomotives were developed; oil prices declined, which wiped out the interest freight railroads had in electrification, while diesel locomotive power and adhesion were improved.  

Meanwhile, the bankruptcy of Penn Central led to the division of the railroad's physical plant between Amtrak, which inherited much of the electrified region, and Conrail.  Increased access charges on the part of Amtrak led to Conrail ceasing electric operations in 1982, dismantling the electrification on its lines and avoiding Amtrak-owned rails. The two locomotives were now surplus to requirements and were returned to EMD, remaining in the LaGrange plant's yard until scrapping in the mid 1980s.

The BC Rail GF6C locomotives used similar technology to the GM6C but had a wide-nose cab and carbody.

References

GM06C
C-C locomotives
11 kV AC locomotives
25 kV AC locomotives
50 kV AC locomotives
Experimental locomotives
Electric locomotives of the United States
Standard gauge locomotives of the United States
Railway locomotives introduced in 1975
Freight locomotives